JW Marriott Miami Turnberry Resort & Spa is a luxury resort in the city of Aventura, Florida. It features golf courses designed by Robert Trent Jones, a spa, tennis facilities, and restaurants.

History
The resort was developed by Donald Soffer, Mark E. Mason, Eugene Lebowitz, and Edward J. Lewis of Oxford Development. In 1988, Donald Soffer sold a 50% interest in the property to Rafael Hotels for $20 million. In 1996, the property underwent a renovation and expansion. The remaining interest was later sold to Rafael Hotels. The property was managed by the Mandarin Oriental Hotel group after Mandarin acquired the Rafael Group. Soffer's Turnberry Associates reacquired the property in 2005. In August 2011, Turnberry ousted hotel manager Fairmont Hotels and Resorts. In May 2012, the property became part of the Autograph Collection Hotels.

In 2017, Turnberry announced plans for the expansion of the property, including a re-branding into a JW Marriott property.

References

Seaside resorts in Florida
Golf clubs and courses in Florida
Buildings and structures in Miami-Dade County, Florida
Tourist attractions in Miami-Dade County, Florida
JW Marriott Hotels
1967 establishments in Florida